The flathead flounder (Hippoglossoides dubious) is a flatfish of the family Pleuronectidae. Its native habitat is the northwestern Pacific, particularly the seas of Japan and Okhotsk, and the coastlines of Kamchatka and Korea.

Reproduction

Females undergo one reproductive cycle per year and produce between 90,000 and 950,000 eggs during each cycle.

References

flathead flounder
Fish of Japan
Sea of Okhotsk
flathead flounder